Sweden is the second studio album by the Mountain Goats released on Shrimper Records in 1995.

Track listing

Notes
Despite the title, cover, Swedish alternative titles, and the humorous mini-essay about "The Swedish conspiracy" in the liner notes (written by Paul Lukas, though he was only credited a year later in the liner notes to the band's next release Nothing for Juice), none of the lyrics are explicitly about Sweden itself. Various other locations, such as Seoul, Korea, California, Queens, New York City, Bolivia and Denmark are however all mentioned in the songs. "Duke Ellington" (which appears on the rarities compilation Protein Source of the Future...Now! and the Harriet records compilation The Long Secret), which does mention Sweden, is described as "one of two pieces written for the song-cycle Sweden and intentionally left off of the album".

Personnel
 John Darnielle – vocals, guitar
 Rachel Ware – bass, vocals

References

1995 albums
The Mountain Goats albums
Shrimper Records albums